Stray from the Path is an American hardcore punk band formed in 2001 in Long Island, New York. They have released ten full-length albums. Their first three records were independently released – People Over Profit in 2002, Audio Prozac in 2003, and Our Oceania in 2004. Stray From The Path then signed with Sumerian Records and released six records with them; Villains in 2008, Make Your Own History in 2009, Rising Sun in 2011, Anonymous in 2013, Subliminal Criminals in 2015, and Only Death Is Real in 2017. They are currently signed to UNFD and released their first record under the label in 2019 titled, Internal Atomics. They have been seen on tour with bands such as: Architects, Every Time I Die, The Acacia Strain, Terror, Norma Jean, Underoath, The Ghost Inside, For Today, Stick to Your Guns, Bleeding Through, Comeback Kid, and Counterparts.

History 

The band was formed on Long Island, New York, in 2001. Its original members were Thomas Williams, John Kane, Justin Manas, Ed Edge and Frank Correira. In October 2003, they went into the studio with Joe Cincotta and Terrance Hobbs of Suffocation to record their debut full length, Audio Prozac. In July 2005, after playing extensively over the following eight months to support their record, they released Our Oceania on August 2, 2005. In November 2005 original singer Ed Edge left the band and was replaced by Andrew Dijorio (Drew York). After touring the country DIY, SFTP entered God City Studios and recorded Villains with Converge Guitarist, Kurt Ballou. Upon completion of the record, the songs spread to California, which led to a contract with Sumerian Records. After being recorded independently at God City, Villains was properly released on May 13, 2008. After touring North America, the band saw some lineup changes. Ryan Thompson replaced Frank Correira on bass guitar, Justin Manas moved from drums to guitar replacing John Kane, and drummer Dan Bourke, formerly of This Is Hell, took over the role on drums. SFTP entered the studio with producer Misha Mansoor and recorded 2009's Make Your Own History. After touring North America, and Europe vigorously, the band hit Machine Shop Recordings with producer Will Putney to record their latest record Rising Sun. This record featured guest appearances by Andrew Neufeld of Comeback Kid, Cory Brandan Putman of Norma Jean and Jonathan Vigil of The Ghost Inside. In 2012 they released a download only single "Landmines". They later released Anonymous in September 2013 which featured Jesse Barnett from Stick to Your Guns and Jason Butler from Letlive.

In 2015 they released Subliminal Criminals, continuing the rapcore sound of their previous effort while delving into more social and political themes (including "D.I.E.P.I.G", which specifically reference child abuse allegations towards Front Porch Step and Lostprophets frontman Ian Watkins). This was to be the final album with Dan Bourke on drums, as he would leave the group in 2016 to be replaced by Craig Reynolds. On the day of the 2016 United States presidential election, they released a single entitled "The House Always Wins". On July 12, 2017, they announced details of their new album Only Death Is Real along with single "Goodnight Alt-Right", which attracted criticism from right wing groups upon release due to its lyrics.

In 2018, the ensemble toured with Anti-Flag, the White Noise and Sharptooth.

Musical style and influences 
Their music has been categorised as metalcore, hardcore punk, rapcore, rap metal and nu metal Their earliest material was metalcore containing elements of math rock, however over the years have developed a larger emphasis on groove and technicality. Metal Sucks attributed this development as being due to the band's growing influence from Rage Against the Machine. In an article for Exclaim!, writer Joe Smith-Engelhardt described the band's style as a "Rage Against the Machine-worshipping take on hardcore". Jeannie Blue for Cryptic Rock described it as "behemoth Rapcore meets Rage Against the Machine".

They have cited influences including Refused, Anti Flag, Rage Against the Machine, Converge, Glassjaw and Deftones.

Political views and activism 
The band's members perceive their status provides them with a platform to push their views, with their music covers portrays their opposition to capitalism, economic materialism, police brutality, racial injustice, pedophilia and far-right political ideologies like fascism and the alt-right. In an article for Loudwire, writer Taylor Markarian stated that "As their band name suggests, Stray have never been shy about their opinions on social and political issues and deviating from mainstream thought. They have always been blunt and unapologetic about identifying and criticizing hypocrisy, corruption, racism, sexism and other social justice issues". In a 2017 article for Metal Hammer, Williams stated:

Publications have generally described their ideology as being left-wing, however the members prefer not to subscribe to a particular side of the political spectrum, with Williams stating that "If Donald Trump was to say something that I liked – which may only be when hell freezes over – then I'll like it. I'm never going to not like something that someone says because of whatever label they're under. I've gone on record saying this, but Hillary Clinton was scarier to me than Trump. Cause that guy will say shit to your face whereas as Hillary will shake your hand, smile, and then kill you in your sleep".

During the 2016 United States presidential election, the band were vocal in their opposition to both main party candidates, with Williams in particular showing support for Bernie Sanders. In a 2017 article for KillYourStereo.com, Williams stated that "When people ask me about voting, I say that I don't vote and I never will vote. Because when you vote you send a message that it's okay for this system to continue".

Actions not Words in Kenya 
In 2018, the group travelled to Kenya as representatives of the This is Hardcore Foundation to help bring clean drinking water to local villages. On the topic of the project, Williams stated that:

Members 

 Current
 Thomas Williams – lead guitar, vocals (2001–present)
 Andrew "Drew York" Dijorio – vocals (2005–present)
 Anthony "Dragon Neck" Altamura – bass, vocals (2010–present)
 Craig "Cowboy Crag" Reynolds – drums (2016–present)

 Former
 Ed Edge – vocals (2001–2005)
 Frank Correira – bass (2001–2008)
 John Kane – rhythm guitar (2001–2008)
 Justin Manas – drums (2001–2009), guitar (2009)
 Ryan Thompson – bass (2008–2010)
 Dan Bourke – drums (2009–2016)

 Timeline

Discography

Studio albums

Demos 
People Over Profit (2002, Independent)

Split albums 
How to Make a Ucalegon (with Lilu Dallas, 2007, Five Point Records)

References

External links

Metalcore musical groups from New York (state)
American nu metal musical groups
American anti-capitalists
American anti-fascists
Hardcore punk groups from New York (state)
Musical groups from Long Island
2001 establishments in New York (state)
Musical groups established in 2001
Sumerian Records artists
Musical quartets